The 1976–77 NBA season was the 31st season of the National Basketball Association. The season ended with the Portland Trail Blazers winning their first NBA Championship in franchise history, beating the Philadelphia 76ers in six games in the NBA Finals.

Prior to the season, the NBA merged with its primary rival league, the American Basketball Association (ABA). Four ABA teams joined the NBA, all four of which are still in the league today: the San Antonio Spurs, Indiana Pacers, Denver Nuggets, and New York Nets. The Nets became the New Jersey Nets the following season, and now play as the Brooklyn Nets. With these additions, the NBA expanded from eighteen teams to twenty-two.

Notable occurrences
The NBA's rival league, the American Basketball Association, joined with the NBA in the ABA–NBA merger. Four ABA franchises joined the NBA: the New York Nets, the Indiana Pacers, the San Antonio Spurs, and the Denver Nuggets. The other ABA teams had folded prior to the merger, except for the Kentucky Colonels and Spirits of St. Louis, both of whose players were picked up by NBA teams in the ABA dispersal draft.
The NBA Playoffs were expanded from 5 teams per conference to 6, resulting in division winners getting a first round bye.
The 1977 NBA All-Star Game was played at The MECCA in Milwaukee, with the West beating the East 125–124. Julius Erving of the Philadelphia 76ers (one of the new arrivals from the ABA) wins the game's MVP award.
5 of the 10 All-Star starters and 10 of the 24 All-Star participants were former ABA players, and former ABA players filled 4 of the 10 slots on the All-NBA first and second teams. Five former ABA players competed in the NBA Finals: the Philadelphia 76ers' Julius Erving, George McGinnis and Caldwell Jones, and the Portland Trail Blazers' Maurice Lucas and Dave Twardzik.
The Portland Trail Blazers made their first playoff appearance, winning their first and, to date, only NBA Championship. They also become the second team in history (after the 1969 Celtics) to win the NBA Finals after dropping the first two games.

Final standings

By division

By conference

Notes
z, y – division champions
x – clinched playoff spot

Playoffs

Statistics leaders

NBA awards
Most Valuable Player: Kareem Abdul-Jabbar, Los Angeles Lakers
Rookie of the Year: Adrian Dantley, Buffalo Braves
Coach of the Year: Tom Nissalke, Houston Rockets

All-NBA First Team:
F – Elvin Hayes, Washington Bullets
F – David Thompson, Denver Nuggets
C – Kareem Abdul-Jabbar, Los Angeles Lakers
G – Pete Maravich, New Orleans Jazz
G – Paul Westphal, Phoenix Suns

All-NBA Second Team:
F – Julius Erving, Philadelphia 76ers
F – George McGinnis, Philadelphia 76ers
C – Bill Walton, Portland Trail Blazers
G – George Gervin, San Antonio Spurs
G – Jo Jo White, Boston Celtics

All-NBA Rookie Team:
John Lucas, Houston Rockets
Mitch Kupchak, Washington Bullets
Scott May, Chicago Bulls
Adrian Dantley, Buffalo Braves
Ron Lee, Phoenix Suns

NBA All-Defensive First Team:
Bobby Jones, Denver Nuggets
E.C. Coleman, New Orleans Jazz
Bill Walton, Portland Trail Blazers
Don Buse, Indiana Pacers
Norm Van Lier, Chicago Bulls

NBA All-Defensive Second Team:
Jim Brewer, Cleveland Cavaliers
Jamaal Wilkes, Golden State Warriors
Kareem Abdul-Jabbar, Los Angeles Lakers
Brian Taylor, Kansas City Kings
Don Chaney, Los Angeles Lakers

References